M. Gloria Koussihouede, occasionally listed in results as "M. Koussihouede", (born April 4, 1989, in Porto-Novo, Benin) is a swimmer from Benin. She swam at the 2004 and 2008 Olympics.

Results
2004 Olympics: Women's 100 free, 1:30.90 (50th)
2007 World Championships: Women's 50 free, did not swim.
2008 Olympics: Women's 50 free, 37.09 (87th)

References

1987 births
Living people
Beninese female swimmers
Olympic swimmers of Benin
Swimmers at the 2004 Summer Olympics
Swimmers at the 2008 Summer Olympics
People from Porto-Novo